Carson Huey-You (born July 2002) is a child prodigy who is the youngest person to graduate from college in the state of Texas and among the youngest in the world. He graduated from Texas Christian University on May 13, 2017 with a bachelor's degree in physics and with a minor in Mandarin Chinese and mathematics at the age of 14. Huey-You graduated with his master's degree at age 17 in late 2019, and is currently a TCU graduate student seeking a Doctor of Philosophy focused on quantum physics.

Early life 
Huey-You was born in the summer of 2002 to Claretta Kimp and Andre Huey-You, a former pilot. His mother and father divorced when he was very young. 

Huey-You showed exceptional intelligence at a very young age. He was reading chapter books at age two and wanting to learn calculus by age three. His mother, Claretta Kimp, said, "I got him a little calculus book and he could work some of the very first questions in the book and then I thought, ok, you're really smart" recalling the time it really hit her that her son was gifted.

His mother, who studied early education and business at Southern Illinois University, homeschooled him until he was five years old. He and his younger brother, Cannan, attended and graduated from the Accommodated Learning Academy in Grapevine, Texas.

Education
He scored a 1770 on the SAT national college entrance test and graduated from high school as co-valedictorian with a 4.0 GPA at age 10. 

During his time as an undergraduate student, Carson Huey-You commuted between home and campus with his mother. In late 2019 at age 17, Carson Huey-You graduated with a master's degree in physics.

Media 
Carson and Cannan Huey-You were featured in Parade meeting with Bill Nye and discussing the physics related to the Solar eclipse of August 21, 2017. Cannan starred in MythBusters Jr. in 2019, while Carson appeared as an advisor in two episodes.

Personal life
Outside academics, Huey-You enjoys playing the piano, Minecraft, chess, and swimming. Huey-You and his brother both enjoy the Marvel movies and The Lord of the Rings. They also have a dog named Klaus, named after the Nobel Prize winning German physicist Klaus von Klitzing. Huey-You cited The Westing Game as one of his favorite pieces of literature and pot pie as one of his favorite foods.

As of fall of 2018, at the age of 12, his brother, Cannan Huey-You, is a sophomore at Texas Christian University pursuing a degree in astrophysics and engineering; he is working to be an astronaut.

References

2002 births
Living people
American people of Chinese descent
Texas Christian University alumni
Place of birth missing (living people)